, is the 23rd single by the Japanese girl idol group AKB48, released on October 26, 2011.

Release history and information 
The title of the upcoming October single by AKB48 was first announced to 20,000 fans present at the handshake event held to celebrate the launch of the group's 22nd single, "Flying Get", at the Nagoya Dome on September 4.

The single was released in 5 versions: Type A Regular and Limited editions, Type B Regular and Limited editions, and a Theater Edition.

It was written with lyric meant to ease the pain of the tsunami victims from the 2011 Tōhoku earthquake and tsunami, as well as part of the large relief process to help out with restoration as the group has donated over 1.25 billion yen, and continue to hold monthly trip visit to tsunami areas to perform free concerts for the children and elderly in those areas.

Track listing

Type A

Type B

Theater Edition

Members

"Kaze wa Fuite Iru" 

Centers: Atsuko Maeda and Yuko Oshima
 Team A: Haruna Kojima, Rino Sashihara, Mariko Shinoda, Aki Takajō, Minami Takahashi, Atsuko Maeda
 Team K: Tomomi Itano, Yūko Ōshima, Minami Minegishi, Sae Miyazawa, Yui Yokoyama
 Team B: Tomomi Kasai, Yuki Kashiwagi, Rie Kitahara, Mayu Watanabe
 SKE48 Team S: Jurina Matsui, Rena Matsui
 NMB48 Team N: Sayaka Yamamoto

"Kimi no Senaka" 
Under Girls
Center: Aika Ōta
 Team A: Misaki Iwasa, Aika Ōta, Haruka Nakagawa, Ami Maeda
 Team K: Ayaka Kikuchi, Reina Fujie
 Team B: Haruka Ishida, Mika Komori, Sumire Satō, Miho Miyazaki
 Team 4: Maria Abe, Miori Ichikawa, Anna Iriyama, Haruka Shimazaki, Suzuran Yamauchi  
 Kenkyūsei: Rena Katō
 SKE48 Team KII: Akane Takayanagi
 SKE48 Team E: Kanon Kimoto
 NMB48 Kenkyūsei: Eriko Jō

"Vamos" 
Under Girls Baragumi
 Team A: Shizuka Ōya, Chisato Nakata, Sayaka Nakaya, Natsumi Matsubara
 Team K: Mayumi Uchida, Miku Tanabe, Tomomi Nakatsuka, Misato Nonaka, Rumi Yonezawa
 Team B: Kana Kobayashi, Shihori Suzuki, Mariya Suzuki, Rina Chikano, Natsumi Hirajima
 Team 4: Haruka Shimada, Miyu Takeuchi, Shiori Nakamata, Mariya Nagao

"Gondola Lift" 
Under Girls Yurigumi
Center: Ayaka Umeda
 Team A: Haruka Katayama, Asuka Kuramochi
 Team K: Sayaka Akimoto, Ayaka Umeda, Moeno Nitō, Sakiko Matsui
 Team B: Amina Satō, Natsuki Satō, Yuka Masuda
 Team 4: Mariko Nakamura

"Tsubomitachi" 
Team4+Kenkyūsei
 Team 4: Maria Abe, Miori Ichikawa, Anna Iriyama, Haruka Shimazaki, Haruka Shimada, Miyu Takeuchi, Shiori Nakamata, Mariko Nakamura, Mariya Nagao, Suzuran Yamauchi
 Kenkyūsei: Rina Izuta, Karen Iwata, Miyu Ōmori, Rena Katō, Rina Kawaei, Natsuki Kojima, Marina Kobayashi, Erena Saeed Yokota, Yukari Sasaki, Rika Suzuki, Juri Takahashi, Yūka Tano, Wakana Natori, Rina Hirata, Nana Fujita, Tomu Muto, Ayaka Morikawa

Chart performance

Oricon Charts

Billboard Japan

RIAJ Digital Track Chart

Other major charts outside Japan

JKT48 version 
A version of the song was released by the Indonesian idol group JKT48 as their 8th single. It was released on 24 December 2014.

References

External links 
 "Kaze wa Fuite Iru" Type A profile at the King Records website 
 "Kaze wa Fuite Iru" Type A profile at the Oricon website 

2011 singles
AKB48 songs
Songs with lyrics by Yasushi Akimoto
Oricon Weekly number-one singles
Billboard Japan Hot 100 number-one singles
RIAJ Digital Track Chart number-one singles
King Records (Japan) singles